The Time of the Hero (original title: La ciudad y los perros, literally "The City and the Dogs") is a 1963 novel by Peruvian writer and Nobel laureate Mario Vargas Llosa. It was Vargas Llosa's first novel and is set among the cadets at the Leoncio Prado Military Academy in Lima, which he attended as a teenager. The novel portrays the school so scathingly that its leadership burned many copies and condemned the book as Ecuadorian propaganda against Peru.

It won the 1962 Premio Biblioteca Breve for best unpublished novel and the 1963 Premio de la Critica Espanola.

Style and themes
The novel is notable for its experimental and complex employment of multiple perspectives in a non-linear fashion. A technique influenced by William Faulkner and particularly the novel Light in August.

It is a story about adolescence and young males transition to manhood, but is also described to portray a microcosm of the Peruvian society. It features themes such as masculinity, hierarchy, secrecy and the military.

Plot summary
The story concerns the theft of an examination paper by the cadet Cava carried out under orders from Jaguar, the brutal leader of a group of cadets called The Circle. The theft is reported by a lowly cadet called The Slave whom Jaguar consequently murders during military maneuvers. Concerned for the school’s reputation, the administrators choose to ignore further evidence of Jaguar’s guilt.

Background
The novel is based on Vargas Llosa's own experiences of Leoncio Prado Military Academy, which he attended as a teenager in the early 1950s. He worked on the manuscript for the novel while he was living in France and it was published as his first novel in 1962.

Film adaptation 
The novel was adapted into a 1985 film by Peruvian director Francisco Lombardi.

References

External links
. 
 La ciudad y los perros, information on the film from the IMDb

1963 novels
Novels by Mario Vargas Llosa
Peruvian novels adapted into films
Novels set in Lima
Novels set in schools
1963 debut novels
Nonlinear narrative novels
Seix Barral books